Pablo Sebastián Pereyra (born April 28, 1975 in Montevideo) is a Uruguayan footballer who plays as a goalkeeper for Guillermo Brown of the Primera B Nacional in Argentina.

Teams
  Huracán Buceo 1997-2000
  Deportivo Colonia 2001-2004
  Real Arroyo Seco 2005
  Deportivo Colonia 2005-2006
  Peñarol 2006
  La Luz FC 2007
  Real Arroyo Seco 2007-2008
  Guillermo Brown 2008–2013

Titles
Guillermo Brown
Torneo Argentino A: 2010–11

External links
 
 

1975 births
Living people
Footballers from Montevideo
Uruguayan footballers
Association football goalkeepers
Uruguayan expatriate footballers
Huracán Buceo players
Peñarol players
Guillermo Brown footballers
Expatriate footballers in Argentina